The Gift of Christmas may refer to:

 The Gift of Christmas (En Vogue album), 2002
 The Gift of Christmas (Juice Newton album), 2007
 "The Gift of Christmas" (song), a 1995 charity single by supergroup Childliners
 Gift of Christmas, a Christmas pageant in the US